This is a list of Belgian television related events from 1960.

Events
24 January - Fud Leclerc is selected to represent Belgium at the 1960 Eurovision Song Contest with his song "Mon amour pour toi". He is selected to be the fifth Belgian Eurovision entry during Eurosong held at the INR Studios in Brussels.

Debuts

Television shows

Ending this year

Births
2 August - Bart Kaëll, singer & TV host

Deaths